São Vicente Atlético Clube, commonly known as São Vicente, is a currently inactive Brazilian football club based in São Vicente, São Paulo. The club was formerly known as Juvenil Feitiço and as Feitiço Atlético Clube.

History
The club was founded on April 21, 1928, by local sportsmen as Juvenil Feitiço, named after footballer Feitiço. The club was renamed to Feitiço Atlético Clube in 1935, and on April 28, 1950, the club was renamed to São Vicente Atlético Clube. They professionalized its football department in 2002.

Stadium
São Vicente Atlético Clube play their home games at Estádio Mansueto Pierotti. The stadium has a maximum capacity of 4,912 people.

References

Association football clubs established in 1928
Football clubs in São Paulo (state)
1928 establishments in Brazil